Petros Dimitriou (born 22 December 1957) is a Greek professional football manager

References

1957 births
Living people
Greek football managers
Ilioupoli F.C. managers
Vyzas F.C. managers
Agios Dimitrios F.C. managers
Panegialios F.C. managers
Ethnikos Asteras F.C. managers
Proodeftiki F.C. managers
Paniliakos F.C. managers
Chalkida F.C. managers
Acharnaikos F.C. managers
Aittitos Spata F.C. managers
Egaleo F.C. managers
Panachaiki F.C. managers
Sportspeople from Athens